Melody Drama was a Canadian exempt Category B Arabic language specialty channel and was owned by Ethnic Channels Group. It broadcast programming from Melody Drama as well as local Canadian content.

Background
Melody Drama was a top rated entertainment channel from Egypt featuring popular Arabic television series including comedies and dramas.

The Melody TV network was owned by Gamal Marwan, son of Ashraf Marwan. The network ceased to exist by 2013 due to financial difficulties.

References

External links
 Ethnic Channels Group page
 Melody's official website
 YouTube channel

Arab-Canadian culture
Egyptian-Canadian culture
Arabic-language television stations
Digital cable television networks in Canada
Multicultural and ethnic television in Canada
Television channels and stations established in 2011
Television channels and stations disestablished in 2013